National Secondary Route 229, or just Route 229 (or ) is a National Road Route of Costa Rica, located in the Heredia province.{
  "type": "FeatureCollection",
  "features": [
    {
      "type": "Feature",
      "properties": {},
      "geometry": {
        "type": "LineString",
        "coordinates": [
          [
            -83.943654,
            10.319991
          ],
          [
            -83.943181,
            10.320322
          ],
          [
            -83.933727,
            10.32036
          ],
          [
            -83.925334,
            10.320338
          ],
          [
            -83.910095,
            10.320454
          ],
          [
            -83.909597,
            10.319981
          ],
          [
            -83.908771,
            10.320294
          ],
          [
            -83.903356,
            10.320415
          ],
          [
            -83.881785,
            10.320386
          ],
          [
            -83.871969,
            10.320035
          ],
          [
            -83.871655,
            10.305812
          ],
          [
            -83.876685,
            10.300646
          ],
          [
            -83.879177,
            10.291895
          ],
          [
            -83.881403,
            10.287088
          ],
          [
            -83.878859,
            10.28277
          ],
          [
            -83.88356,
            10.271146
          ],
          [
            -83.88307,
            10.261444
          ],
          [
            -83.889933,
            10.24685
          ],
          [
            -83.892776,
            10.238448
          ],
          [
            -83.897787,
            10.232665
          ],
          [
            -83.89936,
            10.227515
          ],
          [
            -83.90172,
            10.22292
          ],
          [
            -83.901907,
            10.215666
          ]
        ]
      }
    }
  ]
}

Description
In Heredia province the route covers Sarapiquí canton (Horquetas district).

References

Highways in Costa Rica